"Beautiful You" is a song written by Dave Hanner, and recorded by American country music group The Oak Ridge Boys.  It was released in November 1980 as the third single from the album Together.  The song reached number 3 on the Billboard Hot Country Singles & Tracks chart.

Chart performance

References

1980 singles
The Oak Ridge Boys songs
MCA Records singles
Song recordings produced by Ron Chancey
1980 songs